Down There may refer to:

 Là-Bas (novel), an 1891 book by the French writer Joris-Karl Huysmans
 Down There (album), the 2010 debut solo album by Avey Tare
 Down There..., a 1991 demo released by Beherit recording as The Lord Diabolus

See also
Down There on a Visit, a 1962 novel by English author Christopher Isherwood